Semen Stepanovych Hulak-Artemovsky (also referred to as Semyon Gulak-Artemovsky and Artemovs’kyj) ( – ), was a Ukrainian opera composer, singer (baritone), actor, and dramatist who lived and worked in Imperial Russia.

He is known mainly for his comic opera Zaporozhets za Dunayem (A Zaporozhian (Cossack) Beyond the Danube), as well as for his dramatic talent and his powerful, rich baritone voice. He was the nephew of the poet Petro Hulak-Artemovsky and a close friend of Taras Shevchenko.

Biography
Hulak-Artemovsky was born in Horodyshche, Kiev Governorate (today in independent Ukraine) to the family of a priest, and went on to study at the Kiev Theological Seminary from 1835 to 1838. Having gained the attention of Mikhail Glinka, at the age of twenty five Semen was brought to the capital of the empire, St Petersburg, in 1838 to receive vocal training directly from Glinka, as well as entry into the Imperial Chapel Choir. The following year, Hulak-Artemovsky left to continue his studies in Italy. Towards the end of his stay in that country, he began performing opera in Florence. Upon his return to St. Petersburg in 1842, Hulak-Artemovsky became a soloist of the Imperial Opera at the Imperial Bolshoi Kamenny Theatre, a position he held for 22 years. In 1852 and 1853 he sang  roles  in Anton Rubinstein's first two operas, Dmitry Donskoy and Fomka the Fool.

Hulak-Artemovsky performed at the Bolshoi Theatre in Moscow from 1864 to 1865. He performed over fifty operatic roles during his career, including Ruslan in Glinka's Ruslan and Lyudmila, Masetto in Mozart's Don Giovanni, as well as Antonio and Lord Ashton in Donizetti's Linda di Chamounix and Lucia di Lammermoor.

A composer of operas, as well as vocal and instrumental music, Hulak-Artemovsky composed his seminal work Zaporozhets za Dunayem in 1864, after completing the libretto in 1862.

His friendship with Taras Shevchenko began in the fall of 1838, after a chance meeting in St. Petersburg. The lifelong friendship continued during Shevchenko's incarceration and subsequent release, and was said to have strongly influenced Hulak-Artemovsky's view of the world. He dedicated his song A Maple Tree Stands Over The River (translit. Stoyit' yavir nad vodoyu) to Shevchenko.

Hulak-Artemovsky died at the age of 60 in Moscow.

Operas
Ukrainian Wedding (translit. Ukrayins’ke vesillya, translit. Ukrainskaya svad'ba) was first performed in 1851, with Hulak-Artemovsky in the role of the father-in-law.
Ivan Kupala Eve (translit. Nich na Ivana Kupala, translit. Noch' nakanune Ivana Kupala) was first performed in 1852
Zaporozhets za Dunayem (translated as A Zaporozhian (Cossack) Beyond the Danube, also referred to as Cossacks in Exile) was premiered  in St. Petersburg, with Hulak-Artemovsky in the role of Karas'.

External links

Semen Hulak-Artemovsky in the Encyclopedia of Ukraine
As Semyon Artemovsky at IMDb

References
Kaufman, Leonid (Лeoнiд Kayфмaн) (1962). С.С. Гулак-Артемовський (S.S. Hulak-Artemovsky), Art.

1813 births
1873 deaths
19th-century classical composers
19th-century Ukrainian male actors
19th-century male opera singers from the Russian Empire
19th-century Ukrainian dramatists and playwrights
Composers from the Russian Empire
Male classical composers
Ukrainian opera composers
Opera librettists
Operatic baritones
People from Horodyshche
People from Kiev Governorate
Ukrainian classical composers
Ukrainian dramatists and playwrights
Ukrainian male stage actors
Ukrainian opera singers